Borden is a surname. Notable people with the surname include:

Amanda Borden (born 1977), American gymnast
Delyone Borden (1985– ), Bermudan cricketer
 Eugene Borden (1897–1971), American character actor 
Sir Frederick Borden (1847–1917), Canadian Minister of Militia and Defence, 1896–1911
Gail Borden (1801–1874), inventor of condensed milk and founder of Borden, Inc.
Gail Borden (figure skater) (1907–1991), American figure skater
Harry Borden (1965– ), portrait photographer
Iain Borden (b. 1962), English architectural historian
James W. Borden (1810–1882), judge and diplomat
Laura Borden (1863–1940), wife of Canadian Prime Minister Robert Borden
Lizzie Borden (1860–1927), American murder suspect; subject of an American nursery rhyme
Lizzie Borden (director) (born Linda Borden, 1958– )
Mary Borden (1886–1968), 20th century novelist
Olive Borden (1906–1947), American film actress
Sir Robert Laird Borden (1854–1937), eighth Prime Minister of Canada, 1911–1920
Steve Borden (born 1959), American professional wrestler better known as Sting
Walter Borden (born 1942), Canadian actor, poet and playwright
William Alanson Borden (1853-1931), American librarian
William Cline Borden (1858–1934), American surgeon and planner of Walter Reed Army Medical Center
William L. Borden (1920–1985), American congressional aide and figure in the Oppenheimer security case
William Whiting Borden (1887–1913), American philanthropist and missionary
Win Borden (1943–2014), American politician, lawyer, and businessman

Fictional characters:
Alfred Borden, a character in the book The Prestige and its film adaptation